Marcio Soares Teles (born 27 January 1994) is a hurdlers runner from Brazil. He competed in the 400 m event at the 2016 Summer Olympics, but failed to reach the final.

He qualified to represent Brazil at the 2020 Summer Olympics.

International competitions

1Did not finish in the semifinals

References

1994 births
Living people
Brazilian male hurdlers
Olympic athletes of Brazil
Athletes (track and field) at the 2016 Summer Olympics
World Athletics Championships athletes for Brazil
Sportspeople from Rio de Janeiro (state)
Athletes (track and field) at the 2018 South American Games
South American Games bronze medalists for Brazil
South American Games medalists in athletics
Ibero-American Championships in Athletics winners
Athletes (track and field) at the 2020 Summer Olympics
21st-century Brazilian people